Isaac Damarell (born 21 February 1994) is a cricketer who plays for Guernsey. He played in the 2014 ICC World Cricket League Division Five tournament. In May 2015 he participated in the 2015 ICC Europe Division One tournament. He made his Twenty20 International (T20I) debut for Guernsey against the Isle of Man on 21 August 2020.

References

External links
 

1994 births
Living people
Guernsey cricketers
Guernsey Twenty20 International cricketers
Place of birth missing (living people)